Archery competitions at the 2019 Pan American Games in Lima, Peru were held between August 7 and 11, 2019 at the Archery field in the Villa María del Triunfo cluster.

In 2017, Panam Sports added compound events (individual and mixed team), marking the first time ever the discipline has been held at the Pan American Games. Also in 2017, the International Olympic Committee approved the addition of a mixed team event in the recurve discipline, which meant it was subsequently added to these games' event program. This means a total of eight events will be held: three each for men and women, along with two mixed events.

The highest ranked athlete in each individual recurve event (that has not yet qualified) will earn a quota spot for their country at the 2020 Summer Olympics in Tokyo, Japan along with the top mixed recurve team.

Schedule
All times are Lima Time (UTC−5).

Medal table

Medalists

Recurve

Compound

Participating nations
A total of 84 athletes from 17 countries competed across eight events.

Qualification

A total of 84 archers will qualify to compete at the games (42 per gender). A country may enter a maximum of eight archers (four per gender). As host nation, Peru qualifies four athletes automatically (one per individual event). Two qualification tournaments were used to determine the 62 qualifiers in recurve and 18 in compound.

See also
Archery at the 2020 Summer Olympics

References

External links
Results book

 
Archery
Pan American Games
2019